Emma Myers (born April 2, 2002) is an American actress. She began her career as a child actress in 2010, when she appeared in The Glades. She made her breakthrough starring as Enid Sinclair in the Netflix series Wednesday in 2022.

Early life 
Emma Myers was born on April 2, 2002, in Orlando, Florida. She attended a homeschool cooperative and "never had a traditional school experience".

Career 
Myers started acting as a child actress in 2010, making her debut in the TV series The Glades. She started professionally acting at the age of 16. Myers appeared in Southern Gospel (2023), A Taste of Christmas (2020), and Girl in the Basement (2021). She had her breakthrough when she starred in the Netflix series Wednesday in 2022, playing Enid Sinclair alongside her co-star Jenna Ortega, who played Wednesday Addams. Myers will next star in the Netflix comedy film Family Leave alongside Jennifer Garner and Ed Helms.

Personal life 
Myers is a fan of K-pop, specifically of the group Seventeen. According to her 2022 interview with Teen Vogue, The Lord of the Rings and Star Wars fandoms were "two fantastical pillars of online fandom that shaped the way Emma saw the world". She describes herself as an introvert.

Filmography

Film

Television

Short Film

References

External links
 

2002 births
21st-century American actresses
Actresses from Orlando, Florida
American child actresses
American film actresses
American television actresses
Living people